Rafael Cadenas (born 8 April 1930 Barquisimeto, Lara) is a Venezuelan poet and essayist.

Career 
He taught for many years at the Central University of Venezuela. He received the National Prize for Literature (1985), Guadalajara's International Book Fair prize of literature (Romance languages) (México, 2009) and García Lorca Prize (2015). Cadenas was awarded the Miguel de Cervantes Prize in 2022, the first Venezuelan to receive the award.

Awards
 Conac's essay prize (1984).
 National Prize for Literature (Poetry)(Venezuela, 1985).
 Juan Antonio Pérez Bonalde's International Prize of Poetry (1992).
 Guggenheim Fellowship (1986).
 Honorary degree from the University of the Andes, Venezuela (2001).
 Honorary degree from the Central University of Venezuela (2005).
 Guadalajara's International Book Fair prize of literature (Romance languages) (México, 2009)
 García Lorca Prize (2015)
 Reina Sofia (2018)
 Miguel de Cervantes Prize (2022)

Works

Poetry
 Cantos iniciales (1946)
 Una isla (1958)
 Los cuadernos del destierro (1960, 2001)
 "Derrota" (1963)
 Falsas maniobras (1966)
 Tiempo Del Machete (1969)
 Intemperie (1977)
 Memorial (1977) Bilingual Edition (Spanish to English)
 Amante (1983)
 Dichos (1992)
 Gestiones (1992)
 Antología (1958–1993) (1996), (1999)
 Amante (bid & co. editor, 2002)
 Poemas selectos (bid & co. editor, 2004, 2006, 2009)
 Amant (bid & co. editor, 2004) [trad. al francés de "Amante")
 Lover (bid & co. editor, 2004, 2009)
 El taller de al lado (bid & co. editor, 2005)
 Sobre abierto (2012)

Essays
 Literatura y vida (1972)
 Realidad y literatura (1979)
 Apuntes sobre San Juan de la Cruz y la mística (1977, 1995)
 La barbarie civilizada (1981)
 Anotaciones (1983)
 Reflexiones sobre la ciudad moderna (1983)
 En torno al lenguaje (1984)
 Sobre la enseñanza de la literatura en la Educación Media (1998)

References

External links
Author's website
"Rafael Cadenas: “Nunca he sabido lo que es un poema”", Harry Almela, 8.31.2008
"Contra la barbarie de la propia estimación: Entrevista con Rafael Cadenas", Claudia Posadas

20th-century Venezuelan poets
1930 births
People from Barquisimeto
Academic staff of the Central University of Venezuela
Living people
Venezuelan essayists
Male essayists
Venezuelan male poets
20th-century essayists
20th-century male writers